The Lenape Stone is a piece of slate found in Bucks County, Pennsylvania in 1872, which appears to depict Native Americans hunting a woolly mammoth. This image, however, seems to have been carved some time after the stone was broken into two; for this and other reasons, it is generally considered an archaeological forgery.

History
The first portion of the stone is reported to have been found in Bucks County by Barnard Hansell, a farmer, in the spring of 1872. In 1881, Hansell sold the fragment to Henry Paxon, a young man with an interest in Native American artifacts. A few months later, Hansell reported finding the second piece of the stone in the same field where he had unearthed the first.

Once the two pieces were joined, they were examined by members of the Bucks County Historical Society, including archaeologist and historian Henry Chapman Mercer. Despite evidence which cast doubt on the stone's origin, Mercer came to be an ardent proponent of its authenticity, an argument which he put forth in his 1885 book, The Lenape Stone, or the Indian and the Mammoth. However, even Mercer acknowledged that the stone's unique nature and a lack of physical evidence (such as soil samples) made scientific certainty impossible.

The stone is currently housed at the Mercer Museum in Doylestown, Pennsylvania.

Physical description
Supporting this theory are the two holes drilled into the stone which would have enabled it to be worn about the neck. The stone comprises two fragments, each of which is decorated with clear engravings on both sides; they form a complete picture when the two halves are joined. On one side there are numerous depictions of turtles, fish, birds, and snakes. The reverse side shows an elephant-like creature, apparently a mammoth, along with humanoid figures, a forest, some teepees, and other markings. The humanoid figures are engaged in battle with the mammoth, and one even appears to have been trampled by it.

Authenticity
There is much evidence against the authenticity of the Lenape Stone. Mammoths are thought to have become extinct in North America around 10,000 years ago, while most gorgets uncovered in archaeological digs are less than 2,000 years old. In addition, other artifacts found in the same field as the Lenape Stone bore stylistically similar carvings, and these were all dated to around 2,000 years ago. There were no witnesses to verify the circumstances under which either fragment of the stone was found, and after it was found, the stone was cleaned multiple times, making geological tests virtually impossible. The carvings on each half of the stone appear not to match up perfectly, which may indicate that they were made after the stone was broken. The stone, therefore, was probably a forgery, the motive for which may have been money, as the stone was sold soon after its discovery.

See also
Holly Oak gorget – another forged artifact bearing a carving of a mammoth

Notes

Further reading
Mercer, Henry Chapman (1885). The Lenape Stone, or the Indian and the Mammoth. (Part A, Part B)

Pseudoarchaeology
Stones
Archaeological forgeries